Jane Elizabeth Perry is a British-Canadian actress. She is perhaps best known for her work as Diana Burnwood in the Hitman series, a role she has played in every game since 2016's soft reboot Hitman. She also played protagonist Selene in 2021's Returnal, for which she won the BAFTA Award for Performer in a Leading Role at the 18th British Academy Games Awards.

Personal life
Perry is of Irish and English descent. Her grandfather Frederic Perry was a cousin of scriptwriter Jimmy Perry. She is currently based in London, UK. She attended the University of Victoria, BC where she studied Theatre and Theatre Arts Management, and Studio 58 Vancouver where she gained a Diploma in Theatre Acting.

Professional life
Perry is a classically trained actress who has worked on stage in both the UK and Canada, in TV series and films. She has also worked as a motion capture artist and as a voice actor.
As a voice over artist she is best known for her work in computer games Hitman, Wildlands, Alien: Isolation, Squadron 42 and Dreamfall Chapters.

Her TV credits include: Ransom for CBS, A Royal Winter for Hallmark, The Assets, The Reckoning for ITV, Spooks for BBC, Superstorm for BBC, The X-Files and Millennium for FOX. While her theatre credits include: Strange Interlude at the National Theatre, Generous at the Finborough Playhouse, Twelfth Night at the Finborough Theatre, and 5 years as a lead actress at The Shaw Festival in Ontario, Canada.

Filmography

Voiceover work

Films

References

External links 
 

Living people
Canadian expatriates in the United Kingdom
University of Victoria alumni
Canadian voice actresses
Canadian people of English descent
Canadian people of Irish descent
Year of birth missing (living people)
BAFTA winners (people)